In mathematics, particularly in set theory, Fodor's lemma states the following:

In modern parlance, the nonstationary ideal is normal.

The lemma was first proved by the Hungarian set theorist, Géza Fodor in 1956.  It is sometimes also called "The Pressing Down Lemma".

Proof

We can assume that  (by removing 0, if necessary).
If Fodor's lemma is false, for every  there is some club set  such that . Let . Then  for each , and so there can be no  such that , so , a contradiction.

Fodor's lemma also holds for Thomas Jech's notion of stationary sets as well as for the general notion of stationary set.

Fodor's lemma for trees

Another related statement, also known as Fodor's lemma (or Pressing-Down-lemma), is the following:

References

 G. Fodor, Eine Bemerkung zur Theorie der regressiven Funktionen, Acta Sci. Math. Szeged, 17(1956), 139-142 .
 Karel Hrbacek & Thomas Jech, Introduction to Set Theory, 3rd edition, Chapter 11, Section 3.
 Mark Howard, Applications of Fodor's Lemma to Vaught's Conjecture. Ann. Pure and Appl. Logic 42(1): 1-19 (1989).
 Simon Thomas, The Automorphism Tower Problem. PostScript file at 
 S. Todorcevic, Combinatorial dichotomies in set theory. pdf at 

Articles containing proofs
Lemmas in set theory